Hittin' the Trail is a 1937 American Western film directed by Robert N. Bradbury. It stars singing cowboy Tex Ritter and Hank Worden.

Plot
Penniless horse traders Tex and Hank meet a stranger in need of a horse. Though he has no money and the pair don't know who he is, when the stranger quotes "Cast your bread upon the waters, for you will find it after many days" from Ecclesiastes 11, they loan him one of their horses. Sheriff Grey accuses Tex of being the Tombstone Kid, the stranger who they loaned a horse to. The Sheriff doesn't believe they aren't criminals until they take them to town where saloon owner James Clark affirms that Tex is not the Tombstone Kid, whose gang is being held in jail as horse thieves.

Clark seeks to use Tex and Hank as a cover for his own gang stealing horses. Clark rigs the roulette wheel in his saloon where Tex wins on the money Clark loaned him; he agrees to buy a herd of horses from Clark to ride them to market, but Clark's gang sets the pair up as horse thieves.

Cast
Tex Ritter as Tex Randall
Hank Worden (billed as Heber Snow) as Sidekick Hank
Jerry Bergh as Jean Reed
Tommy Bupp as Billy Reed
Earl Dwire as James Clark
Charles King as Henchman
'Snub' Pollard as Bartender
Ed Cassidy as Sheriff Grey
Jack C. Smith as Dad Reed
Archie Ricks as Tombstone Kid
Ray Whitley as Musician
The Range Ramblers as Ray Whitley's Band
Earl Phelps as Musician, Ray Whitley's Range Ramblers
Norman Phelps as Musician, Ray Whitley's Range Ramblers
Willie Phelps as Musician, Ray Whitley's Range Ramblers
Ken Card as Banjo player, Ray Whitley's Range Ramblers
The Texas Tornadoes as 2nd Band Group
White Flash as Tex's Horse

Soundtrack
 Tex Ritter and Hank Worden - "Hittin' the Trail" (Written by Harry Miller)
 Tommy Bupp - "I'm a Rippin' Snortin' Sheriff" (Written by Robert N. Bradbury and Lindsley Parsons)
 Tex Ritter - "Blood on the Saddle" (Written by Everett Cheatham)
 Ray Whitley and His Range Ramblers - "Ridin' the Old Prairie Trail" (Written by Ray Whitley)
 Ray Whitley and His Range Ramblers - "Texas Washboard Rag" (Written by Ray Whitley)
 Tex Ritter - "Headin' For Town" (Written by Frank Sanucci)
 Tex Ritter and the posse riders - "The Vagabond Song" aka "The Renegade Song" (Written by Glenn Strange)
 Tex Ritter - "I'm A Natural Born Cowboy" (Written by Rudy Sooter)

External links

1937 films
1930s English-language films
American black-and-white films
1937 Western (genre) films
Grand National Films films
American Western (genre) films
Films directed by Robert N. Bradbury
1930s American films